Rossomando is a surname. Notable people with the surname include:

Anna Rossomando (born 1963), Italian politician
Anthony Rossomando (born 1976), American writer-producer, composer, and guitarist
Peter Rossomando (born 1972), American football player and coach